The New York Cocoa Exchange was a commodities exchange  in New York City where futures contracts on cocoa were bought and sold. The exchange was located at 82 Beaver Street in Manhattan
for most of its existence.

On September 28, 1979, the New York Coffee and Sugar Exchange merged with the New York Cocoa Exchange and the New York Coffee and Sugar Exchange merged
to become the Coffee, Sugar and Cocoa Exchange. That exchange later merged with the New York Board of Trade, in turn acquired by IntercontinentalExchange, which operates its American futures operations as ICE Futures U.S.

IntercontinentalExchange states that the ICE Futures U.S. Cocoa contract "is the benchmark for world cocoa prices."

References

External links

Financial services companies established in 1925
Financial services companies disestablished in 1979
Commodity exchanges in the United States
Companies based in Manhattan
1925 establishments in New York City
1979 disestablishments in New York (state)
American companies disestablished in 1979